The Harold A. Wildstein (HW), originally named for Private Joseph F. Merrell, was an 168-bed jail barge used to hold inmates for the New York City Department of Corrections. The barge was scrapped on Staten Island but was previously docked on Rikers Island, near Hunts Point.

History
Originally built in 1951, it was used by the Staten Island Ferry.  Originally called the Private Joseph F. Merrell  being the last two steam ship ferries along with the Cornelius G. Kolff for the Staten Island ferry.   It took on the name of VCBC until the name was transferred to another barge. It was later named after Wildstein,  who was a NYC Correctional Civilian Staff worker who was murdered in a robbery. As the population on Rikers Island decreased, the use of the Harold A. Wildstein declined. In 2002, it was shuttered for inmate use, and was put up for sale. In 2004, it was sold for scrap metal and docked in a dock in New Jersey.

Salvage
The Wildstein was finally purchased by a scrapping company until its final demolition after 2003.

See also
List of jail facilities in New York City

References

Harold A. Wildstein
Prisons in New York City
Jails in New York City
Defunct prisons in New York City
1987 establishments in New York City
2004 disestablishments in New York (state)
New York City Department of Correction
Staten Island Ferry vessels